Gaunt Brothers Racing was a Canadian professional stock car racing team that competes in the NASCAR Cup Series. Gaunt Brothers Racing also competes in the Pinty's Series and the K&N Pro Series. The team is owned by Marty Gaunt, president and CEO of Triad Racing Technologies; GBR originally used engines from Triad before moving to Toyota Racing Development motors in alliance with Joe Gibbs Racing.

NASCAR Cup Series

Car No. 96 history

On January 18, 2017, Gaunt Brothers Racing declared their plans to attempt the 2017 Daytona 500 with Canadian driver D. J. Kennington behind the wheel of the No. 96 Toyota Camry. The team was fielded in a partnership with RAB Racing. They plan to attempt all four superspeedway events in 2017. Kennington made the 59th annual Daytona 500, by passing Elliott Sadler at Cam-Am Duel 2. The team failed to finish the race after being involved in a crash just past halfway. The team returned to Talladega where they used ThorSport Racing's No. 98 hauler. The team failed to qualify. They didn't return to Daytona in July because Kennington joined Premium Motorsports, leaving the team without a driver.

However, the team, with Kennington, returned to Daytona in an attempt to qualify for a second straight 500 in 2018, guaranteed after only 40 showed up to try to get in the race. The team entered the spring ISM Raceway race, which would be their first appearance on a non-restrictor track, qualifying 34th. Parker Kligerman joined GBR for the Coca-Cola 600, his first Cup race since 2014. Jeffrey Earnhardt joined the team in August 2018 for 14 of the final 16 races. Jesse Little was announced to drive at the August Bristol night race. Earnhardt and GBR parted ways before the Martinsville race. He was replaced by Kennington at Martinsville and Kligerman at Texas.

Kligerman returned to the team in an attempt to qualify the Daytona 500 and drove the majority of the races during the 2019 NASCAR season that featured Gaunt Bros. Racing. Drew Herring came on board to drive the season finale at Homestead for the team.

On January 17, 2020, Kligerman announced that he has no plans to return to the No. 96 or in any of NASCAR's three national series. On January 28, Daniel Suárez officially signed with Gaunt Brothers Racing to race the No. 96 full-time in 2020. Despite Suárez's eligibility, the team did not participate in the 2020 Busch Clash to focus on the 2020 Daytona 500. The move came as GBR had a total of three chassis in the shop, some dating back to 2012 as Michael Waltrip Racing originals. Suárez failed to make the Daytona 500 after finishing 22nd in Duel 1 of the 2020 Bluegreen Vacations Duels when he collided with Ryan Blaney in turn 4. On September 15, Gaunt Brothers Racing and Suárez announced that they would be parting ways in 2021.

On January 19, 2021, it was announced that Ty Dillon would replace Daniel Suarez for the 2021 season. Despite finishing sixth in the first Duel of the 2021 Bluegreen Vacations Duels, Dillon missed the 2021 Daytona 500. On April 15, 2021, it was announced that Harrison Burton would make his Cup Series debut at Talladega. In this race, Burton would become the first driver born in the 2000s decade to run a Cup Series race.Landon Cassill would then drive the #96 for the next two Superspeedway races at Daytona and Talladega respectively finishing in 36th at Daytona and then 24th at Talladega. Parker Kligerman then would return to the team at Kansas giving the team its best run of the season with a 20th-place finish.

The team quietly ceased operations after the 2021 season.

Car No. 96 results

Camping World Truck Series

Truck No. 96 history
In August 2017, GBR and Kennington reunited to run the Truck race at Canadian Tire Motorsports Park, where Kennington drove the No. 96.

Pinty's Series

Car No. 11 history
The team announced its Pinty's Series involvement in May 2010, initially setting John Gaunt as driver of the No. 11 entry. Gaunt started seven of the twelve events in the series that year. In 2011, Jason Bowles joined the team for two races, winning the pole in one.

References

External links
 
 

NASCAR teams